Raja Satyavrata (Kannada: ರಾಜ ಸತ್ಯವ್ರತ) is a 1961 Indian Kannada film, directed by D. Shankar Singh and produced by N. Bhakta Vatsalan. The film stars Udaykumar, T. N. Balakrishna, Dikki Madhava Rao and Prathima Devi in the lead roles. The film has musical score by M. Venkataraju.

Cast
Udaykumar
T. N. Balakrishna
Dikki Madhava Rao
Prathima Devi

References

External links
 

1961 films
1960s Kannada-language films
Films scored by M. Venkataraju